Tsao may refer to:

 Ts'ao (the apostrophe is often omitted), the Wade–Giles romanization of the Chinese surname Cao
 Tsao, Botswana, village

See also 
 Tsou people
 General Tso's chicken
 General Tsao (disambiguation)
 General Tso (disambiguation)
 Conversations with Tsao